= Public opinion of militaries =

Public opinion on militaries refers to the general population's views of the armed forces.

== Overview ==
Around the world, confidence in the military is high. International surveying has shown a median of 72% of adults have faith in the military. Global Support for the military has not faced a decline in recent years. Over 140 countries have report having higher confidence in their militaries in 2026 compared to 2006.

== Africa ==
Afrobarometer's Round 10 (2025) data reports that the country of South Africa increasingly trusts its army and supports the possibility of military rule. Two-thirds of South Americans surveyed say they trust the army "somewhat" or "a lot," while 49% say that they would approve of military rule.

== Asia ==
Gunduz (2024) finds that party choice in Turkish elections correlates to the level of support an individual has for the military. Left-wing party voters associated with the CHP and pro-Kurdish party favor the Turkish military less than the right-wing party voters at a statistically significant rate.

== Australia ==
Survey data from UNSW Canberra finds that trust in the Australian military remains high among the public. 69.4% of those surveyed trust the military as an institution, while 65.7% trust the military to be ethical. Most respondents reported being unsure or uninformed about Australian military operations. Roughly one-third of respondent's favor additional funding for the military. 88.2% of the public supports the military in carrying out domestic defense assistance, while 68.4% support the military in conducting disaster relief efforts. 54.4% of those surveyed want to continue working with allies and partners like the United States. The Australian public favors a defense treaty with Papua New Guinea, but only 37% of respondents report being aware of it. 42.1% of respondents feel confident in the government's support of military veterans.

== Europe ==
Eurobarometer 104 (Autumn, 2025) data reports that 79% of Europeans in EU countries support a common defense and security policy with other EU nations. 35% of respondents also favor increasing military and defense spending when asked about what should be prioritized in the EU budget.

Eurobarometer 105 (Spring, 2026) data reports the highest level of cooperation and support among EU countries on record, with 81% of those surveyed favoring a common defense and security policy among EU nations.

== North America ==
Pew Research Center (2024) data shows that 60% of Americans report having positive feelings towards the military, while 36% report having negative feelings. Adults under 30 are the only age group that express that the military has a more negative impact than a positive one (53% to 43%). Seven-in-ten Americans over 50 report that the military has a positive impact. Americans between 30 and 49 years of age support the military by 57%. Both Republicans (64%) and Democrats (60%) share a positive view of the military. 68% of conservative and moderate Democrats support the military, while only 50% of liberal Democrats support the military. 67% of moderate and liberal Republicans support the military, while 63% of conservative Republicans support the military. 64% of White Americans, 60% of Asian Americans, 58% of Black Americans, and 53% of Hispanic Americans view the military positively.

== South America ==
Da Cruz (2024) reports that the Brazilian public's trust in the armed forces declined between 2018 and 2020. 34.63% of respondents in 2018, 29.47% of respondents in 2019, and 27.55% of respondents in 2020 reported having high trust in the military. 15.55% in 2018, 19.46% in 2019, and 19.91% in 2020 reported having low trust in the military.
